Faces of Death (later re-released as The Original Faces of Death) is a 1978 American mondo horror film written and directed by John Alan Schwartz, credited under the pseudonyms "Conan Le Cilaire" and "Alan Black" respectively.

The film, shown in a documentary-like style, centers on pathologist Francis B. Gröss, played by actor Michael Carr. The narrator presents the viewer with a variety of footage showing different gruesome ways of dying from a variety of sources. Some of the most iconic scenes were faked for the film, while most of the film is pre-existing video footage of real deaths or the aftermath of death.

Faces of Death received generally negative reviews, but was a huge success at the box office, reportedly grossing over $35 million worldwide. It gained a cult following, was eventually deemed artistically significant to film and also spawned several sequels, the first of which, Faces of Death II, was released in 1981. All of the following sequels either contained less or no fake footage.

Plot
After performing open heart surgery on an unnamed patient, pathologist Francis B. Gröss states to the viewer that he has become interested with the transitional periods of life and death thanks to a recurring dream that features grotesque deaths, which his experience as a surgeon has desensitized him to. He has accrued footage from himself or several parts of the world in an effort to better understand the many "faces of death".

Footage is played of animal deaths, including chickens at a slaughterhouse, dog fights, the mummified corpses of the deceased inhabitants of Guanajuato, the natural predators of the Amazon rainforest and the ways they kill their prey, a monkey being killed and its brain being eaten by guests of a banquet, and a man killed by an alligator, which Gröss calls a "violent retaliation from a creature who has suffered continued abuse from mankind".

Gröss next narrates over recordings of assassinations, stating that homo sapiens are the only species to kill for greed. Assassin François Jordan is interviewed, admitting that he kills solely for payment, not for "political" or "social value". Gröss introduces another type of killer, "the one who kills for no apparent reason". A gunfight ensues between a SWAT team and an armed murderer who is shot, after which the team enters the killer's house to find his family stabbed to death; Gröss questions whether the man's actions were caused by society. As criminal Larry DeSilva is executed by electric chair, Gröss questions "if two wrongs make a right".

Gröss visits a Chinese morgue, where Dr. Thomas Noguchi is performing the embalming process on multiple corpses after their autopsies. One cadaver is a pale, horrifically bloated drowned woman; the other a decapitated man whose skin is peeled off his skull for examination. Gröss askes Noguchi for his thoughts on his own embalming process after he dies, to which he replies, "life is purely a transitory state". One cadaver, Samuel Berkowitz, has his bodily fluids replaced with a liquid with a low freezing point, and his body stored in a freezer with 24/7 maintenance. Gröss explains the purpose of this "particularly costly" process is to preserve the body for future sciences to revive him.

The next segment displays war and atrocities in history, including the Holocaust. The segment ends with Nazis being obliterated in battle, with Gröss adding that Hitler "lost control not only of his army, but of his mind". Footage of a woman jumping from 23 stories and hitting the concrete is shown. Gröss admits that suicide is a face of death he wishes to never face again.

Footage of animals dying due to litter and pollution is shown, followed by sick children in impoverished villages due to polluted lands and famine. More of the "horrific nature of man" is examined with footage of a cannibalistic cult eating the innards of a cadaver stolen from a morgue and partaking in an orgy after. Gröss abruptly leaves, fearing for the safety of him and his crew.

Footage of several more tragic accidents is shown, culminating in a scene of a wing walker attempting a parachute jump from his plane but dying after the parachute fails to open properly. Gröss disputes the notion that this death was quick and painless, as he would have been conscious and aware for the entire fall to the ground. The segment ends with photographs, footage and air traffic control audio from the crash of PSA Flight 182 and its grisly aftermath of scattered mutilated body parts and numerous destroyed houses. Gröss states that the neighborhood still smells like "rotting bodies and jet fuel", and that a mutilated body with only its torso and right hand "is the worst face of death".

Gröss introduces his next topic, the role of supernatural forces in death. He meets with architect Joseph Binder, whose wife and son both died under tragic circumstances. He confides to the viewer that he believes his family remain as ghosts in his house, attempting to communicate with him. Gröss enlists the services of parapsychologists to verify this. The team takes photographs of footprints and two apparitions. Binder communicates with the spirits of his family through a medium, seemingly confirming the existence of life after death.

After studying Binder's case, Gröss concludes, "when we die, it isn't really the end" as "the soul in each of us remains a traveller forever". Gröss ends by questioning whether death is "the end of the beginning or the beginning of the end" and leaves the footage he has shown to the viewer's interpretation. The film ends with peaceful music, footage of a baby's birth and photos of the child growing up happily.

Cast
 Michael Carr as Francis B. Gröss
 Samuel Berkowitz as victim
 Mary Ellen Brighton as suicide victim
 Thomas Noguchi as Chief Medical Examiner Coroner

Production 
The movie was written and directed by John Alan Schwartz (credited as "Alan Black" for writing and as "Conan LeCilaire" for directing). Schwartz also took credit as second unit director, this time as "Johnny Getyerkokov". He also appears in one of the segments of the film, as the leader of the alleged flesh eating cult in San Francisco and has brief appearances in several other movies of this series. Schwartz wanted to depict very real death with "an analytical view, rather than a purely exploitive purpose", but the films inclusion of fake scenes have brought this to debate. The movie features Michael Carr as the narrator, and 'creative consultant' called "Dr. Francis B. Gröss", whose voice is reminiscent of Leonard Nimoy in the popular TV show In Search of.... John Alan Schwartz has said that this movie's budget was $450,000 and there are estimates that it has grossed more than $35 million worldwide in theatrical releases, not including rentals.

Although several of the human death scenes and one depicting a monkey being killed are obvious fakes (with Allan A. Apone, make-up and special effects artists for the movie saying that about 40% of it is fake), most of the remaining footage is genuine (approx. 60%). Most of the footage was bought from excised Germany, and others were rejected newsreels and medical examiner footage. The sequence of Samuel Berkowitz's cryogenic freezing actually occurred the same year as the film's release, but in 1986 he was given a proper burial due to budget and loss of interest from the family. In their book Killing for Culture, authors David Kerekes and David Slater note that the nadir of the movie is the inclusion of an extreme fatal accident; "the shattered remains of a cyclist are seen under a semi-tractor trailer. The camera pans long enough to capture paramedics scooping up blood clots, brain matter, and clumps of hair from the tarmac – this incident is authentic and culled from newsreels." According to the DVD Commentary, the creators were eventually brought to light the victim was actually a man, not a woman as described in the film. Schwartz became aware of this after the victim's sister (unsure if she's featured) protested the use of this footage.

According to Schwartz, the scene in the film wherein a murderer is executed by electric chair was achieved with the use of a fake chair built in a friend's loft and toothpaste to emulate saliva. Electric "zapping" sounds were added in post-production. He was inspired to make the scene after reading about a recent execution by electric chair and was surprised to find it still in practice. He wanted to find a way to film a real chair execution, but none were available at the time of production.

The infamous Flight 182 crash happened no less than 2 weeks before the film's release, and graphic footage depicting the crash aftermath, destroyed houses and scattered body parts were included into the film near the climax. Still images and air traffic audio were used for the crash itself, because no actual footage is known to exist. According to Schwartz, the film was pretty much completed, but reworked immediately after the crash occurred.

Censorship
Due to its graphic content, Faces of Death was banned and censored in many countries. The movie is often billed as "Banned in 46 Countries", but this claim is doubtful. In the United Kingdom, the film was prosecuted and added to the "video nasty" list, as it was deemed to violate the Obscene Publications Act 1959. In 2003, the film was allowed to be released on DVD in the UK; however, cuts of 2 minutes and 19 seconds were required by the British Board of Film Classification (BBFC) to remove scenes of "fighting dogs and [a] monkey being cruelly beaten to death in accordance with Cinematograph Films (Animals Act) 1937 and BBFC Guidelines." In 1980, Faces of Death was refused classification by the Australian Classification Board. Despite the ban, several bootleg VHS tapes were released in the country, and the film was unbanned and released uncut on DVD in 2007. However, its sequels remain banned in the country. The film was also banned in New Zealand in 1989. In Germany, the film was edited for a VHS release, with the removal of some graphic scenes. The ban in Germany was lifted in Spring of 2022.

Reception 
The film was received relatively poorly by critics, both retrospectively and contemporary. Review aggregator website Rotten Tomatoes reports that Faces of Death received a 27% critical approval rating of 11 surveyed critics; the average rating was 4.3/10. Writing for the Kansas City Kansan, reviewer Steve Crum denounced the film as "crude, tasteless exploitation footage. Filmed carnage." He ended his review urging the viewer to "be ashamed to watch this garbage."

Joshua Siebalt of Dread Central had mixed feelings about the film: "as a curiosity piece, Faces of Death is well worth a look, especially if you've not seen it in a very long time. As for its place in horror cinema history, well, that remains to be seen. As I said it's not a film that holds up very well at all, but considering how groundbreaking it was for its time, I doubt anyone will ever forget it. And while it is nice to have all of the myths about Faces finally addressed by the people who created it, it also takes some of the fun out if it, too."

Christopher Kulik of DVD Verdict wrote, "The YouTube generation will be unable to comprehend what purpose the film served thirty years ago, and thus it's difficult to ignore how hopelessly dated Faces of Death really is. In short, it's a cinematic experiment which has long outlived its effects, although it remains compelling for film and horror buffs viewing the film in the proper perspective. For the curious virgins, I say give it a shot only if you can handle what has been described up until this point; if you can get through Faces of Death, then you can get through just about anything. Feel free to judge for yourself."

In his review, Screen Anarchy's Ard Vijn was dismissive of the film, remarking that "many of the segments have lost their ability to shock, or can easily be recognized as fake by today's more media-savvy audience. Interesting as a curious bit of film history, but nothing more."

It was ranked #50 on Entertainment Weeklys "Top 50 Cult Films of All Time" in 2003.

Legacy 
A number of straight to video sequels were made, containing far more real footage, some containing only real footage. Faces of Death II, Faces of Death III, and Faces of Death IV, as well as Faces of Death: Fact or Fiction? (a documentary on the making of the series) were written and at least partially directed by John Alan Schwartz. Faces of Death II contained real footage of a dead body being pulled from under a pier, Guerrilla death squads in El Salvador, napalm bombings in Vietnam, the drugging of a monkey, a dolphin slaughter, a train disaster in India, Cambodian patients with leprosy, a death museum featuring Pablo Escobar's preserved head, a driver high on PCP and a boxer going down for his “final” count. The gas station robbery is the only scene outside of the narration to have been faked. Much like the PSA Aircraft crash, the assassination attempt on President Ronald Reagan occurred recently before the film's completion, and was included as well. Faces of Death III featured real footage of the German Autobahn, drug smugglers getting blown away by the Coast Guard, a parachutist landing in a crocodile pit, a videotaped rape/murder (that is uncertain to be real or not), a car thief getting ripped apart by two junkyard dogs, and footage of the last public execution by guillotine in France featuring a very young Christopher Lee. 

Faces of Death V and Faces of Death VI were released in the mid-90s, and are compilations made up entirely of highlights from the first four movies, with no new footage, intentionally released in countries where the original movies were banned. The first three featured Carr as "Dr. Gröss", although The Worst of Faces of Death (released between installments III and IV and consisting of highlights from the first three installments) instead featured Schwartz's brother, James Schwartz, as "Dr. Louis Flellis". Flellis explains that he accidentally killed "Dr. Gröss" while operating on him the prior week. However, in Faces of Death IV, Flellis explains the absence of Dr. Gröss by stating that he had killed himself, having been driven insane as a result of witnessing so much death.

Also released with the title Faces of Death VII, was a condensed version of Anton LaVey's 1989 film Death Scenes; and another assemblage of stock footage titled Faces of Death part 7 was released as an online file sometime during the late 1990s.

Faces of Death 8 followed soon after. Released only in Germany, and made by unknown individuals, it is a collection of mostly unrelated gore scenes from around the world, with no narration, and no on-screen credits, aside from its title.

In May 2021, it was reported that Legendary Entertainment had purchased the rights to the film, and a remake was in development, with filmmakers Isa Mazzei and Daniel Goldhaber attached to direct. The film will star Barbie Ferreira and Dacre Montgomery.

Legal cases
In June 1985, mathematics teacher Bart Schwarz showed the film to his class at Escondido High School in Escondido, California. Two of his students, Diane Feese and Sherry Forget, claimed they were so traumatized by the film that they both "developed an unnatural fear of dying and suffered emotional distress." The families of the two girls sued the school district and received a combined $100,000 settlement ($57,500 for Feese and $42,500 for Forget). Schwarz was suspended from the school for 15 days without pay, but was not fired.

In November 1986, Canton High 14-year-old Rod Matthews bludgeoned his classmate Shaun Ouilette to death with a baseball bat. Matthews claimed the idea to kill Ouilette was conceived after he viewed Faces of Death, as he was curious about what it would be like to actually kill someone. He had shown previous signs of mental illness. Matthews was sentenced to life in prison, with parole eligibility after 15 years. In February 2022, he was denied parole for the fourth time.

Home media 
Faces of Death and its sequels were released in boxset form on DVD by MPI Home Video in July 2002. Australian distributor Umbrella Entertainment released the film on DVD in 2007. In 2008, Gorgon Video released the movie on DVD and Blu-ray for its 30th anniversary. A brand new high definition transfer was made with new material and a 5.1 digital soundtrack. The company still offers VHS editions of the film, with the 1980s and 1990s box art.

See also
Traces of Death
 Snuff film

References

External links
 
 

 
1978 films
1978 documentary films
1978 horror films
American documentary films
1970s German-language films
American exploitation films
Films shot in California
Films shot in Los Angeles
Films shot in Mexico
Films shot in San Francisco
American independent films
Mondo films
Obscenity controversies in film
Animal cruelty incidents in film
Video nasties
1970s exploitation films
Documentary films about death
American splatter films
1970s English-language films
1970s American films